Ahmed Muhammad Ismail Kamil Habash (born 26 April 1984) is an Egyptian windsurfer, who specialized in Neil Pryde RS:X class. He is currently trained for Cairo Yacht Club under his personal coach Ibrahim Ismail, and has also represented Egypt for the first time in sailing history at the 2012 Summer Olympics. As of September 2013, he is ranked no. 112 in the world for the sailboard class by the International Sailing Federation.

Habash competed in the men's RS:X class at the 2012 Summer Olympics in London by receiving an allocated  place from ISAF. Struggling to attain a top position in the opening races, Habash accumulated a net score of 334 for a last place finish in a fleet of thirty-eight windsurfers.

References

External links
 
 
 
 

1984 births
Living people
Egyptian male sailors (sport)
Olympic sailors of Egypt
Sailors at the 2012 Summer Olympics – RS:X
Sportspeople from Giza
Egyptian windsurfers